Revolutionary Young Communist League (in Portuguese: União da Juventude Comunista Revolucionária, UJCR) was the youth league of the Portuguese Communist Party (Reconstructed).

Youth wings of political parties in Portugal
Youth wings of communist parties